Jimmy O’Brien (born 1938 in New Ross, County Wexford) is a retired Irish sportsperson.  He played hurling with his local club Geraldine O’Hanrahans and with the Wexford senior inter-county team from 1957 until 1968.

Playing career

Club
O’Brien played his club hurling with his local club Geraldine O’Hanrahans in New Ross.  He had several successes with the club, including winning a Wexford Senior Hurling Championship title with the club in 1966.

Inter-county
O’Brien first came to prominence on the inter-county scene with the Wexford senior team in 1957.  He made his debut in a National Hurling League game against Dublin in January of that year.

In 1958, Wexford made it to the final of the National League.  Limerick were the opponents on that occasion and O'Brien played as a substitute.  Wexford won the game on a score-line of 5-7 to 4-8 giving O’Brien his first major title.

Two years later in 1960, O'Brien was the regular left corner-forward on the team.  That year Wexford reached the Leinster final where Kilkenny provided the opposition.  Wexford won the game by 3-10 to 2-11 giving O'Brien his first Leinster Senior Hurling Championship title.  This victory allowed Wexford to advance directly to the All-Ireland final where Tipperary were the opponents.  O'Brien's side got off to a good start with a quick goal by Mick Hassett.  A second goal was scored by Oliver McGrath just after the interval to put Wexford in the lead. With a minute to go, the crowd invaded the pitch thinking that the game was over.  When the disorder was cleared, Tipperary continued but only had twelve players on the field.  Bill Moloughney scored a later point for Tipperary; however, this was not entered into the official records.  It was too late in any case, as Wexford won by 2-15 to 0-11 giving O’Brien his first All-Ireland medal.

Wexford lost their provincial crown in 1961, however, O’Brien captured a second Leinster medal in 1962 as Kilkenny lost by 3-9 to 2-10.  Another All-Ireland final meeting with Tipperary beckoned for Wexford and O’Brien. Wexford men got off to a bad start as Tom Moloughney and Seán Moloughney scored two goals for Tipperary inside the first minute.  Wexford fought back and the game remained level for most of the rest of the match.  O’Brien himself scored a notable goal from all of seventy yards out.  It was not enough for Wexford as Tipperary won the game by 3-10 to 2-11.

Wexford were outclassed in Leinster for the next two years, however, 1965 saw O'Brien add a third provincial medal to his collection as Kilkenny were defeated once again.  Yet again, Wexford faced Tipperary in the All-Ireland final.  Tipperary won easily with two hand-passed goals by Seán McLoughlin.  Tipperary also scored seven unanswered points in the last quarter to win the game by 2-16 to 0-10.

In 1967 O’Brien was captain of the Wexford team as he captured a second National League medal.  The following year he won his fourth and final Leinster title.  Kilkenny, who were the reigning All-Ireland champions, were accounted for in the provincial decider on a score line of 3-13 to 4-9.  For the fourth time of the decade Wexford subsequently faced Tipperary in the All-Ireland final with the Munster men leading by two victories to one.  At half-time it looked as if Tipp were cruising to another victory as they took an eight-point lead.  Just after the restart Wexford had a Christy Jacob goal disallowed before Tony Doran scored a goal after just six minutes.  Tipp fought back; however, it was too late as Wexford won by 5-8 to 3-12.  It was O’Brien’s second All-Ireland medal.  It also turned out to be his last game for Wexford as the knee trouble that had caused him trouble throughout recent seasons finally meant an end to his inter-county career.

Provincial
O’Brien also lined out with Leinster in the inter-provincial hurling competition.  He won his sole Railway Cup medal in 1965 as Leinster defeated Munster.

References

1937 births
Living people
Geraldine O'Hanrahan's hurlers
Wexford inter-county hurlers
Leinster inter-provincial hurlers
All-Ireland Senior Hurling Championship winners